Mudan Township is a mountain indigenous township in Pingtung County, Taiwan. The main population is the Paiwan people of the Taiwanese aborigines.

History
Formerly called Botansia.

Geography

 Area: 
 Population: 4,846 people (February 2023)

Administrative divisions
The township comprises six villages: Gaoshi, Mudan, Shimen, Silin, Tungyuan and Xuhai.

Infrastructures
 Mudan Dam

Tourist attractions
 Dongyuan Wetland
 Gaoshi Shrine
 Shihmen Historical Battle Field

See also
 Mudan Incident (1871)

References

External links

 Mudan Township Office 

Townships in Pingtung County
Taiwan placenames originating from Formosan languages